Umshana is a 2015 Eswatini black and white drama film directed by Bi Phakathi and produced by BIP Films. The film stars Mbali Dlamini and Delani Dlamini in lead roles along with Lisa Mavuso, Temakhosi Nkambule, Fineboy Mhlanga in supportive roles.

It is the first all-Siswati speaking feature film and it was completely filmed in the Kingdom of Eswatini.

Cast
 Mbali Dlamini as Gugu
 Delani Dlamini as Themba
 Lisa Mavuso as Gugu's Friend
 Temakhosi Nkambule as Precious
 Fineboy Mhlanga as Uncle

References

External links
 

2015 films
Swazi drama films
2015 drama films